Kells railway station may refer to:

 Kells railway station (Northern Ireland), on the Ballymena and Larne Railway, in County Antrim, Northern Ireland
 Kells railway station (County Kerry), on the Great Southern and Western Railway, in County Kerry, Ireland
 Kells railway station (County Meath), on the Dublin–Navan railway line, in County Meath, Ireland